Austrostipa flavescens, commonly known as coast spear-grass, is a species of grass in the genus Austrostipa, family Poaceae. It is native to southern Australia. It grows as a perennial tussock grass, with flat to narrow inrolled leaves, up to about 1.2 m in height. It is found on sandy, sandy loam and limestone soils as well as on dunes.

References

flavescens
Bunchgrasses of Australasia
Angiosperms of Western Australia
Flora of New South Wales
Flora of South Australia
Flora of Tasmania
Flora of Victoria (Australia)
Plants described in 1805